Manure is organic matter that is used as organic fertilizer in agriculture. Most manure consists of animal feces; other sources include compost and green manure. Manures contribute to the fertility of soil by adding organic matter and nutrients, such as nitrogen, that are utilised by bacteria, fungi and other organisms in the soil. Higher organisms then feed on the  fungi  and bacteria in a chain of life that comprises the soil food web.

History
According to a Byzantine tradition attributed to Cassianus Bassus pig dung was generally not usable as fertilizer, except for almond trees. Similar views recorded by Columella were unrelated to the Islamic taboos of later centuries, though the medieval Andalusian writer Ibn Bassal and some later writers from Yemen also recorded negative effects of pig dung "burning" plants. The sweepings from hot baths included urine and human wastes, which Ibn Bassal describes as dry and salty, unsuitable for use as fertilizer unless mixed with manure. Ibn Bassal gives two recipes for composting pigeon (hamam) and possibly donkey (himar) manure, though the translation is uncertain. Bassal says the excessive heat and moist qualities of pigeon dung worked well for weaker and less hardy plants, especially those affected by cold temperatures.

Types

There are in the 21st century three main classes of manures used in soil management:

Animal manure

Most animal manure consists of feces. Common forms of animal manure include farmyard manure (FYM) or farm slurry (liquid manure). FYM also contains plant material (often straw), which has been used as bedding for animals and has absorbed the feces and urine. Agricultural manure in liquid form, known as slurry, is produced by more intensive livestock rearing systems where concrete or slats are used, instead of straw bedding. Manure from different animals has different qualities and requires different application rates when used as fertilizer. For example horses, cattle, pigs, sheep, chickens, turkeys, rabbits, and guano from seabirds and bats all have different properties. For instance, sheep manure is high in nitrogen and potash, while pig manure is relatively low in both. Horses mainly eat grass and a few weeds so horse manure can contain grass and weed seeds, as horses do not digest seeds the way that cattle do. Cattle manure is a good source of nitrogen as well as organic carbon. Chicken litter, coming from a bird, is very concentrated in nitrogen and phosphate and is prized for both properties.

Animal manures may be adulterated or contaminated with other animal products, such as wool (shoddy and other hair), feathers, blood, and bone. Livestock feed can be mixed with the manure due to spillage. For example, chickens are often fed meat and bone meal, an animal product, which can end up becoming mixed with chicken litter.

Compost

Compost is the decomposed remnants of organic materials.  It is usually of plant origin, but often includes some animal dung or bedding.

Green manure
Green manures are crops grown for the express purpose of plowing them in, thus increasing fertility through the incorporation of nutrients and organic matter into the soil.  Leguminous plants such as clover are often used for this, as they fix nitrogen using Rhizobia bacteria in specialized nodes in the root structure.

Other types of plant matter used as manure include the contents of the rumens of slaughtered ruminants, spent grain (left over from brewing beer) and seaweed.

Uses

Animal manure 

Animal manure, such as chicken manure and cow dung, has been used for centuries as a fertilizer for farming. It can improve the soil structure (aggregation) so that the soil holds more nutrients and water, and therefore becomes more fertile.  Animal manure also encourages soil microbial activity which promotes the soil's trace mineral supply, improving plant nutrition.  It also contains some nitrogen and other nutrients that assist the growth of plants.

Odor is an obvious and major issue with animal manure. Components in swine manure include low molecular weight carboxylic acids, acetic, propionic, butyric, and valeric acids.  Other components include skatole and trimethyl amine.

Animal manures with a particularly unpleasant odor (such as slurries from intensive pig farming) are usually knifed (injected) directly into the soil to reduce release of the odor. Manure from pigs and cattle is usually spread on fields using a manure spreader. Due to the relatively lower level of proteins in vegetable matter, herbivore manure has a milder smell than the dung of carnivores or omnivores. However, herbivore slurry that has undergone anaerobic fermentation may develop more unpleasant odors, and this can be a problem in some agricultural regions.  Poultry droppings are harmful to plants when fresh, but after a period of composting are valuable fertilizers.

Manure is also commercially composted and bagged and sold as a soil amendment.

In 2018, Austrian scientists offered a method of paper production from elephant and cow manure.

Dry animal dung is used as a fuel in many countries around the world.

Issues 

Any quantity of animal manure may be a source of pathogens or food spoilage organisms which may be carried by flies, rodents or a range of other vector organisms and cause disease or put food safety at risk.

In intensive agricultural land use, animal manure is often not used as targeted as mineral fertilizers, and thus, the nitrogen utilization efficiency is poor. Animal manure can become a problem in terms of excessive use in areas of intensive agriculture with high numbers of livestock and too little available farmland.

The greenhouse gas nitrous oxide can be emitted so contributing to climate change.

Livestock antibiotics
In 2007, a University of Minnesota study indicated that foods such as corn, lettuce, and potatoes have been found to accumulate antibiotics from soils spread with animal manure that contains these drugs.

Organic foods may be much more or much less likely to contain antibiotics, depending on their sources and treatment of manure. For instance, by Soil Association Standard 4.7.38, most organic arable farmers either have their own supply of manure (which would, therefore, not normally contain drug residues) or else rely on green manure crops for the extra fertility (if any nonorganic manure is used by organic farmers, then it usually has to be rotted or composted to degrade any residues of drugs and eliminate any pathogenic bacteria—Standard 4.7.38, Soil Association organic farming standards). On the other hand, as found in the University of Minnesota study, the non-usage of artificial fertilizers, and resulting exclusive use of manure as fertilizer, by organic farmers can result in significantly greater accumulations of antibiotics in organic foods.

See also

 Album graecum
 Anaerobic digestion
 Biosolids
 Chicken manure
 Coprophilous fungi
 Cow dung
 Dry animal dung fuel
 Earthen manure storage
 Liquid manure
 Manure spreader
Reuse of excreta

References

External links

 Application and environmental risks of livestock manure
 North American Manure Expo
 Cornell Manure Program
 County-Level Estimates of Nitrogen and Phosphorus from Animal Manure for the Conterminous United States, 2002 United States Geological Survey
 Manure Management, Water Quality Information Center, U.S. Department of Agriculture
 Livestock and Poultry Environmental Learning Center, an eXtension community of practice about animal manure management
 Antibiotics and Hormones in Animal Manure (Webcast): A two part webcast series about the science available on potential risks and best management practices related to antibiotics and hormones from animal manure

 
Animal waste products
Feces
Organic fertilizers
Soil improvers